A list of films produced in Russia in 1992 (see 1992 in film).

1992

See also
 1992 in Russia

External links

1992
Russia